Zamas may refer to:

 Zamas, Jayuya, Puerto Rico, a barrio
 Zamas River, Puerto Rico
 Zamasu, a character in the Dragon Ball Super manga series